Jacob Glennemo (born 25 May 1987) is a Swedish professional golfer who played on the Challenge Tour between 2013 and 2020. He won the 2014 Nordic Golf League Order of Merit.

Professional career
Glennemo turned professional in 2007 and joined the Nordic Golf League. He recorded his maiden NGL victory at the 2012 Landskrona Masters and finished 5th in the season rankings, to qualify for the Challenge Tour. As a Challenge Tour rookie in 2013 he made 7 cuts in 16 starts. He was also runner-up at the Black Mountain Invitational in Thailand behind Johan Edfors, and made his first cut on the European Tour, at the Lyoness Open in France.

In 2014, he won three tournaments and topped the Nordic Golf League Order of Merit, to again secure a Challenge Tour card. In 2016 he was tied 7th at the Najeti Open in France.

In 2018 he won three tournaments including the Swedish Golf Tour Final, and finished second in the NGL season rankings, to again earn promotion to the Challenge Tour. He won the 2018 Swedish Golf Tour Order of Merit and the associated cash bonus. In 2019, he finished tied 10th at the Italian Challenge Open.

Glennemo has recorded a 59 twice in his career, at the 2017 Race to Himmerland and at the 2020 AIK-Golfen. In 2018, he reached a career best Official World Golf Ranking rank of 382. He retired from tour following the 2020 season.

Amateur wins
2004 Bankboken Tour Regional #5 - Sörmland
2005 FöreningsSparbanken Tour Riks #2 - Stockholm
2006 Skandia Tour Elit #5 Slag

Source:

Professional wins (10)

Nordic Golf League wins (7)

Other wins (3)
2007 Arninge Open
2008 Skyways Open
2012 Norrporten Open

Source:

References

External links

Swedish male golfers
Golfers from Stockholm
1987 births
Living people